The 1942 All-Southern Conference football team consists of American football players chosen by the Associated Press (AP) and United Press (UP) for the All-Southern Conference football team for the 1942 college football season.

All-Southern Conference selections

Backs
 Tom Davis, Duke (AP-1)
 John Cochran, Wake Forest (AP-1)
 Joe Muha, VMI (AP-1)
 Harvey Johnson, William & Mary (AP-1)

Ends
 Bob Gantt, Duke (AP-1)
 Glenn Knox, William & Mary (AP-1)

Tackles
 Pet Preston, Wake Forest (AP-1)
 Marvin Bass, William & Mary (AP-1)

Guards
 Garrard Ramesey, William & Mary (AP-1)
 Tom Burns, Duke (AP-1)

Centers
 Louis Sossamon, South Carolina (AP-1)

Key
AP = Associated Press

UP = United Press

See also
1942 College Football All-America Team

References

All-Southern Conference football team
All-Southern Conference football teams